The 2021 General Tire 150 was an ARCA Menards Series race held on March 12, 2021. Contested over 150 laps on the  oval, it was the second race of the 2021 ARCA Menards Series season.

Entry list

Practice 

Qualifying 
Qualifying was cancelled due to rain. Ty Gibbs earned the pole for the race, as starting lineup was determined by practice times.

Qualifying results

Race

Race results 
Laps: 150

References 

2021 ARCA Menards Series West
2021 ARCA Menards Series
NASCAR races at Phoenix Raceway
General Tire 150 (Phoenix)
General Tire 150 (Phoenix)